Francavilla Fontana is a railway station in Francavilla Fontana, Italy. The station is located on the Taranto–Brindisi railway and Martina Franca-Lecce railway. The train services are operated by Trenitalia and Ferrovie del Sud Est. The railway infrastructure is managed by Rete Ferroviaria Italiana.

Train services
The station is served by the following service(s):

Night train (Intercity Notte) Milan - Ancona - Pescara - Foggia - Bari - Taranto - Brindisi - Lecce
Local services (Treno regionale) Taranto - Francavilla Fontana - Brindisi
Local services (Treno regionale) Martina Franca - Francavilla Fontana - Novoli - Lecce

References

This article is based upon a translation of the Italian language version as at May 2014.

Railway stations in Apulia
Station
Buildings and structures in the Province of Brindisi